WGW may refer to:

Wagawaga language (New Guinea) – former ISO 639 code WGW; later split into codes YLB (Yaleba) and WGB (Wagawaga)
Whitby Goth Weekend, a goth music festival in North Yorkshire, England
Wigan Wallgate railway station, Greater Manchester, England (station code WGW)
WorldGenWeb, genealogy project